Godhuli Alap is an Indian Bengali Romantic Drama television series produced by Raj Chakraborty under the banner of Raj Chakraborty Productions. It premiered on 21 March 2022 on Bengali General Entertainment Channel Star Jalsha. The show is available on Disney+ Hotstar. The show stars Kaushik Sen, Somu Sarkar  and Diya Chakraborty.

Synopsis 

Nolak is presented as a young woman who whose life takes a twist, taking her Kolkata-based advocate Arindam. Arindam spent most of his time fighting a case that had been running for almost 20 years. He had taken an oath that he would not marry until he brings peace to the farmers of Mourigram. But destiny brought these two souls together due to a promise made to Nolak's father.

The story depicts that love does not respect age, caste or creed. It shows how love can grow among people from diverse backgrounds even without the support of the society.

Cast

Main 
Kaushik Sen as Arindam Roy aka AR: Nolak's husband; Anu, and Aditya's brother; Nikhilesh,Illa, and Kasturi's nephew; Agni, Judo,Trisha and Dona's cousin; Arundhati and Akhilesh's son; Mekhla's uncle; A middle-aged advocate. (2022–present)
Somu Sarkar as Nolak Roy:Haradan's daughter; Arindam's wife; Mekhla's aunt; A sweet and young lovely girl living in a village; owner of a Bohurupi group, now become an intelligent and junior advocate.(2022–present)

Recurring
Sohag Sen as Arundhati Roy: Arindam, Anu and Aditya's mother and Nolak's mother-in-law; Akhilesh's widow. (2022–present)
Sumanta Mukherjee as Nikhilesh Roy, Arindam's Uncle, Arundhati's brother-In-Law (2022)
Mou Bhattacharya as  Illa Roy; Arindam's Aunt;,Late Nikhilesh's  wife; Agni and Trisha's mother; Chaiti's mother-in-law. (2022) 
Bhaswar Chattopadhyay as Agni Roy, Trisha's elder brother; Arindam, Anu,Adi, Dona's cousin; Nikhilesh's son (2022–present)
Arpita Mukherjee as Chaiti Roy; Agni's wife; Arindam's sister-in-law. (2022–present)
Diya Chakraborty as Trisha: Agni's sister; Arindom's cousin.(2022–present)
Arijita Mukhopadhyay as Buri Pishi (2022) 
Riju Biswas as Aditya Roy: Arindam's youngest brother, Rohini's husband. (2022–present)
Suvajit Kar as Jayanta: Buri Pishi's son (2022–present)
Sahana Sen as Anu: Arindam's sister (2022–present)
Sincheeta Sanyal as Mekhla: Anu's daughter ; Arindam's niece(2022–present)
Ranjini Chatterjee as Kasturi: Arindam's paternal aunt (2022–present)
Sristi Pandey as Dona: Kasturi's daughter; Arindam's cousin  (2022–present)
Roshni Bhattacharya as Rohini Roy: Arindam's assistant; Adi's wife(2022–present)
Shamik Chakrabarty as Judo: Kasturi's youngest son (2022–present)
Arindya Banerjee as Laalu (2022) 
Milan Roychowdhury as Haradhan/Kanai: Nolok's father (2022–present)
Gautam Mukherjee as Kasturi's husband, Akhilesh & Nikhilesh's Brother-In-Law (2022–present)
Sayantan Halder as Santanu Sanyal. 
Bulbuli Panja as Arindam's ex girlfriend
Niladri Lahiri as Santanu's father

References

External links 
 ''Godhuli Alap'' on Disney+ Hotstar

Bengali-language television programming in India
2022 Indian television series debuts
Indian drama television series
Star Jalsha original programming